Jenderal Soedirman University (Javanese: ꦲꦸꦤꦶꦮ꦳ꦼꦂꦱꦶꦠꦱ꧀​ꦗꦺꦤ꧀ꦢꦼꦫꦭ꧀​ꦱꦸꦢꦶꦂꦩꦤ꧀, abbreviated as Unsoed) is a public university located in Purwokerto, Banyumas Regency, Central Java, Indonesia and was established on September 23, 1963. The university named after Jenderal Soedirman (English: General Soedirman), the first commander-in-chief of the Indonesian Army during the country's fight for independence to commemorate his service for the Indonesian nation. He was born in the Banyumas region.

Due to its location nearby to Mount Slamet and Purwokerto as a relatively small city, Unsoed is mostly preferred by students because of its cool and comfortable environment and provides an affordable living costs for university students in general.

History

In the 1960s, the highest education facilities in Banyumas residency was senior high schools, includes general and vocational schools. Meanwhile, local Banyumas society became more interested in higher education; the lack of higher education institutions in the region meant that fresh high school graduates went outside the region if they wanted to get a degree. Hampered by the high cost of living outside the region, only students from wealthy families could afford it.

This sparked the idea to establish a university in the region. The first step was the creation of agriculture faculty establishment board on February 10, 1961, followed by the establishment of Jenderal Soedirman University foundation on November 20, 1961. The faculty of agriculture was the first faculty established on September 20, 1962, under cooperation with Diponegoro University.

The Faculty of Agriculture was the precursor to establish Jenderal Soedirman University with more faculty and administration systems. On November 27, 1963, a ceremony was held in a Banyumas residential house to formally established the Jenderal Soedirman University. The official launching was conducted by the Minister of PTIP, Dr. Tojib Hadiwidjaja. This establishment was possible with aid from other educational institutions, PTIP Department (now Dikti), provincial government of Central Java and leaders of the Indonesian armed forces.

When established, Unsoed only had three faculties: Faculty of Agriculture, Faculty of Economics and Business, and Faculty of Biology. On its development, Unsoed established another new faculties, mainly: Faculty of Animal Husbandry (1966), Faculty of Law (1982), Faculty of Social and Political Science (1993), Postgraduate Program (1994), Faculty of Medicine (2001), Faculty of Mathematics and Natural Science (2007), Faculty of Engineering (2009), Faculty of Health Sciences (2014), Faculty of Humanities (2014), and Faculty of Fishery and Marine Science (2014).

Universitas Jenderal Soedirman is the oldest and one of the only public university in the former Banyumas Residency. Thus affecting the student composition, from 25,782 of total active students in 2008, students from local Banyumas region accounted for almost 35% while the rest are from other regions in Indonesia as far as Sumatera and Sulawesi. About 5000 students enrolled at the university every year. Universitas Jenderal Soedirman is also considered as one of the most preferred university in national college entrance due to its competitiveness to enter select departments/faculties. In 2016, Unsoed ranked number 16 in Indonesia and accredited as grade-A university in 2018. In 2020, Unsoed ranked 14th as a favorite university in SBMPTN conducted by LTMPT. In 2021, Unsoed achieved rank number 17 as the best university in Indonesia according to Scimago Institutions Rankings (SIR) and successfully positioned in Top 20 of the best universities in Indonesia. Unsoed has a goal and ambitions to pursue local wisdom development and is also known as Kampus Berbasis Kearifan Lokal and committed to be a "World Class Civic University".

Identity

Name 

The name "Jenderal Soedirman" in Jenderal Soedirman University is a concept of honorary to the Great Commander-In-Chief Soedirman as an Indonesian national hero who was born in former Banyumas Residency region (now Purbalingga Regency).

Seal 
The Seal of Unsoed consisted of a crown of lotus flower that has five petals, colored in yellow gold and lined with black border to symbolize Unsoed as a university that based on Pancasila.

The lotus crown has a black silhouette of Great Commander-In-Chief Soedirman and wearing a traditional Banyumasan head attire known as iket. General Soedirman portrayal is hoped to convey a symbol of his spirit, aspirations, and ambitions to the whole people in Unsoed.

Above the portrait of General Soedirman, there is a golden five-pointed star which symbolizes the faith to One and Only God.

Below the portrait of General Soedirman, there is a white magnolia flower which had three petals on the left and the right, and two leaves that symbolizes honesty, truth, justice, warrior, responsibility, and resilience.

Official Apparel 
The official apparel of Unsoed is a suit jacket in golden yellow as the color of Jenderal Soedirman University. On the pocket section, there sewn the seal of Unsoed. The suit jacket is used commonly on official agenda such as freshmen student welcoming ceremony, orientation day, and student/university event.

Anthem 
The official anthem of Jenderal Soedirman University is the Hymn of Jenderal Soedirman University and the March of Jenderal Soedirman University. The hymn was composed by R. A. J. Soedjasmin which titled "Harumkan Wiyata Tinggi" (English: To Honor the Greatest Enlightenment) and is sung during official events.

The March of Jenderal Soedirman University is titled "Tingkatkan Martabat Bangsa" (English: Elevate the Dignity of the Nation), composed by R. A. J. Soedjasmin, is the informal anthem which occasionally sung in most of regular events.

Flags 
The Flag of Unsoed and The Faculties is the official flag that is usually displayed during ceremonial event, such as freshmen student welcoming ceremony in Graha Widyatama Prof. Rubijanto Misman (Unsoed Convention Center Building). The color of Unsoed flag is yellow with the seal emblazoned in the middle of the flag. The flag color of every faculty in Unsoed is:

Faculties and departments

Undergraduate (Bachelor) and Vocational (Associate) Programs
Unsoed undergraduate programs (sarjana) and vocational programs (diploma) are held under 12 faculties.

International Undergraduate Program (IUP) Unsoed 

 Faculty of Economics and Business

 Bachelor of Management
 Bachelor of Development Economics
 Bachelor of Accounting

 Faculty of Law

 Bachelor of Law

 Faculty of Biology

 Bachelor of Biology

 Faculty of Health Sciences

 Bachelor of Nursing

Postgraduate Program 
 Monodiscipline Master Programs

 Faculty of Economics and Business
 Master of Accounting
 Master of Management
 Master of Development Economics
 Faculty of Social and Political Science
 Master of Sociology
 Master of Public Administration
 Master of Communication Science
 Master of Political Science
 Faculty of Law
 Master of Law
 Faculty of Medicine
 Master of Biomedicine
 Faculty of Biology
 Master of Biology
 Faculty of Agriculture
 Master of Agronomy
 Master of Food Science
 Faculty of Animal Husbandry
 Master of Animal Science
 Faculty of Fishery and Marine Science
 Master of Aquatic Resource
 Master of Marine Science
Faculty of Health Sciences
Master of Public Health
Faculty of Engineering
Master of Civil Engineering
 Multidiscipline Master Program

 Master of Environment Science
 Master of Agricultural Extension
 Master of Agricultural Biotechnology
 Master of Agribusiness
Doctoral Program

 Doctor of Management
 Doctor of Economics
 Doctor of Law
 Doctor of Animal Science
 Doctor of Agriculture
 Doctor of Biology

Campuses

Grendeng 
Grendeng campus serves as the central part of Unsoed, located in Jalan H.R. Boenyamin and Jalan Kampus. This campus is dedicated for three faculties in the cluster of social science: Faculty of Law, Faculty of Social and Political Science, and Faculty of Economics and Business. Grendeng campus is the home for important buildings in Unsoed, such as Rectory, Central Administration Office, University Central Library, Graha Widyatama Prof. Rubijanto Misman Auditorium, Nurul Ulum University Mosque, Institute of Learning Development and Quality Assurance, Institute of Technology and Informatics Development, Procurement Unit Office, and Student Admission Office.

Beside that, Grendeng campus also accommodates other activity by providing several amenities like Soemardjito Convention Center, Unsoed Press, and Lecturer's Residence.

Another project being built in Grendeng Campus is a recently planned campus hotel, Unsoed Inn, which is still in progress since 2020.

Karangwangkal 

Karangwangkal campus located in Jalan Dr. Soeparno, mostly serve as home for faculties dedicated in the cluster of science and technology: Faculty of Biology, Faculty of Health Sciences, Department of Dentistry, Faculty of Mathematics and Natural Sciences, Faculty of Fisheries and Marine Science, Faculty of Animal Husbandry, Faculty of Agriculture, Faculty of Humanities, and School of Postgraduate Programs.

Most of Unsoed's major facility is located in Karangwangkal campus, mainly: Soesilo Soedarman Sports Complex, Wisma Soedirman (dormitory), Unsoed Dental and Oral Hospital, Experimental Farm, Unsoed Student Activity Center, Institute of Research and Community Service, and Integrated Academic Building that serves as shared laboratory and classrooms.

Blater 
Blater is the farthest campus in Unsoed, home for Faculty of Engineering, which located in the Purbalingga Regency, roughly 21 km away from Purwokerto. Blater campus' land is originally a gift from local government of Purbalingga that requests Unsoed to build a faculty dedicated to that city as an attempt to advance local engineering education and provide easier access and opportunity to higher education for Purbalingga local citizens. Faculty of Engineering began operation in 2007 (originally in 2000 as a program) under the name Department of Engineering, Faculty of Science and Engineering (split from Faculty of Mathematics and Natural Sciences) and operates independently in 2014 after becoming its own faculty.

Berkoh 
Berkoh campus serves Faculty of Medicine, located in Jalan Dr. Gumbreg, this campus is closely related to Margono Soekarjo Regional Hospital complex. This campus contains three main buildings, Gedung A (classrooms for 1-3 semester student), Gedung B (classrooms for 5-7 semester student), Gedung C (dean's office, laboratory, OSCE lab, SOCA lab, Hall, and educational service office).

Kalibakal 
Kaliabakal campus is the home for Department of Dentistry, Faculty of Medicine, Klinik Pratama Soedirman, and laboratories.

Research and innovation 

 Evaporative drying for animal sperm storage, an innovation by Dr. Mulyoto Pangestu, lecturer at Faculty of Animal Husbandry (now lecturing at Monash University, Australia) to accommodate an affordable way to preserve farm animal sperm other than expensive nitrogen-based preservation.
 Padi Gogo Aromatik Unsoed-1, a type of superior rice breed developed by joint researchers, one of them is Prof. Dr. Ir. Soewarto, M.S. (ex-rector), that yields high-quality grains and able to withstand dry agricultural areas.
 Orange quality automated detector, a development conducted by Susanto Budi Sulistyo, Dr. Siswantoro, Ir. Agus Margiwiyatno, Ir. Masrukhi, Dr. Asna Mustofa, Arief Sudarmaji, Rifah Ediati, Riana Listanti, Hety Handayani Hidayat, using an affordable near-infra red AS7263 based technology to determine quality of oranges.

Achievement 

 Ranked 17th in Indonesia at SCImago Institutions Rankings in 2021.
 2nd position at Anugerah Humas Dikti kategori Badan Layanan Umum in 2020.
 Ranked 16th at Pemeringkatan Dikti, Ministry of Research and Higher Education in 2016.

Notable alumni

Arts and Culture 

 Ahmad Tohari, Indonesian author and humanist, famously known for his trilogy work Ronggeng Dukuh Paruk and filmed in Sang Penari
 Nasihin Masha, head redactor of Harian Republika
 Nanik S. Deyang, journalist

Politics and Government 

 Hernani Filomena Coelho da Silva, Minister of Petroleum of East Timor
 Albertina Ho, career woman judge at Supreme Court of the Republic of Indonesia
 Rustiningsih, Vice Governor of Central Java in 2008-2013
 Mahyudin, Deputy Speaker of MPR in 2014-2019
 Eko Sarjono Putro, member of parliament at DPR RI
 Agung Widiyantoro, regent of Brebes (2011-2012), member of parliament DPR RI (2014-2019)

Science and Technology 

 Mulyoto Pangestu, researcher of alternative for animal sperm cryopreservation method

Education 

 Prof. Rudi Priyadi, M.S., rector of Universitas Siliwangi (2018-2022)

Economics 

References

External links
 
 

Universities in Indonesia
Educational institutions established in 1920
Universities in Central Java
Banyumas Regency
Indonesian state universities
1920 establishments in the Dutch East Indies